Holy Grail Temple is a  summit located in the Grand Canyon, in Coconino County of northern Arizona, US. It is situated seven miles north-northeast of Havasupai Point, and two miles west-northwest of King Arthur Castle, within the Shinumo Amphitheater. According to the Köppen climate classification system, Holy Grail Temple is located in a cold semi-arid climate zone, with precipitation runoff draining south to Shinumo Creek, which flows west to the Colorado River.

History

Holy Grail Temple was originally named "Bass Tomb" in 1891 by Virginia Dox, for William Wallace Bass, who was Dox's guide into the Grand Canyon at this location. Impressed by her, Bass named nearby Dox Castle shortly after she left. However, at the suggestion of the U.S. Geological Survey, Bass Tomb was renamed "Holy Grail Temple", for the Holy Grail of the Legend of King Arthur, in keeping with the naming theme for other geographical features in the vicinity, e.g. King Arthur Castle, Guinevere Castle, Elaine Castle, Excalibur, Gawain Abyss, Bedivere Point, Lancelot Point, and Galahad Point. This feature's present name was officially adopted in 1908 by the U.S. Board on Geographic Names.

When William W. Bass died in 1933, his ashes were scattered by plane atop this mountain as per his wishes. Bass Canyon and the Bass Trails still retain his name within the Grand Canyon.

The difficult first ascent of the summit was made in 1977 by Larry Treiber and Bruce Grubbs.

Geology

The summit spire is composed of cream-colored Permian Coconino Sandstone. This sandstone, which is the third-youngest stratum in the Grand Canyon, was deposited 265 million years ago as sand dunes. Below the Coconino Sandstone is slope-forming, Permian Hermit Formation, which in turn overlays the Pennsylvanian-Permian Supai Group. Further down are strata of the cliff-forming  Mississippian Redwall Limestone, Cambrian Tonto Group, and finally Proterozoic Unkar Group at creek level.

The actual small-spire summit is a capstone of Coconino Sandstone, on a small slope of Hermit Formation. This summit sits upon an extensive shelf of the Supai Group, specifically the highly resistant, and thick in western Grand Canyon, Esplanade Sandstone.

See also
 Geology of the Grand Canyon area
 History of the Grand Canyon area

References

External links 

 Weather forecast: National Weather Service
 William Wallace Bass: Kaibab.org
 William Bass photo: Wikimedia
 Holy Grail Temple from Lancelot Point photo by Harvey Butchart

Grand Canyon
Landforms of Coconino County, Arizona
Mountains of Arizona
Mountains of Coconino County, Arizona
North American 2000 m summits
Colorado Plateau
Grand Canyon National Park
Grand Canyon, North Rim
Sandstone formations of the United States